The Old Baptist Union is a group of evangelical Baptist churches in the United Kingdom.

History
The Old Baptist Union was founded in 1880, owing largely to the labours of Henry Augustus Squire, an itinerant preacher. Currently the Old Baptist Union has 16 member churches (in England and Wales) with about 700 members.

The churches of the Old Baptist Union are General Baptist, believing in general atonement (that in His death, Jesus atoned generally for the sins of all).  They historically put more emphasis on the laying on of hands, divine healing and personal holiness than some other Baptist affiliations.

The Union is a member of both the Free Churches Council and the Evangelical Alliance, and most of its churches are members of local geographic Associations of the Baptist Union of Great Britain.  Its government structure is somewhat of a combination between congregational and presbyteral, involving in each church the appointment of Elders. The Old Baptist Union's executive body is called the "Council of Management," and is composed of all the ordained officers of churches holding membership in the Union. An Annual General Meeting is held.

Sources
Articles of Faith of the Old Baptist Union
Baptists Around the World, by Albert W. Wardin, Jr.

External links
 Official Website

Baptist denominations in the United Kingdom
Religious organizations established in 1880
1880 establishments in the United Kingdom